A salt lake or saline lake is a landlocked body of water that has a concentration of salts (typically sodium chloride) and other dissolved minerals significantly higher than most lakes (often defined as at least three grams of salt per litre). In some cases, salt lakes have a higher concentration of salt than sea water; such lakes can also be termed hypersaline lakes, and may also be pink lakes on account of their colour. An alkalic salt lake that has a high content of carbonate is sometimes termed a soda lake.

One saline lake classification differentiates between:
subsaline: 0.5–3‰ (0.05-0.3%)
hyposaline: 3–20‰ (0.3-2%)
mesosaline: 20–50‰ (2-5%)
hypersaline: greater than 50‰ (5%)
Large saline lakes make up 44% of the volume and 23% of the area of lakes worldwide. This means that saline lakes make up nearly half of global lake volume.

Properties

Salt lakes form when the water flowing into the lake, containing salt or minerals, cannot leave because the lake is endorheic (terminal). The water then evaporates, leaving behind any dissolved salts and thus increasing its salinity, making a salt lake an excellent place for salt production. High salinity can also lead to halophilic flora and fauna in and around the lake; sometimes, in fact, the result may be an absence or near absence of multicellular life in the salt lake.

If the amount of water flowing into a lake is less than the amount evaporated, the lake will eventually disappear and leave a dry lake (also called playa or salt flat).

Brine lakes consist of water that has reached salt saturation or near saturation (brine), and may also be heavily saturated with other materials.

Most brine lakes develop as a result of high evaporation rates in an arid climate with a lack of an outlet to the ocean. The high salt content in these bodies of water may come from minerals deposited from the surrounding land. Another source for the salt may be that the body of water was formerly connected to the ocean. While the water evaporates from the lake, the salt remains.  Eventually, the body of water will become brine.

Because of the density of brine, swimmers are more buoyant in brine than in fresh or ordinary salt water.  Examples of such brine lakes are the Dead Sea and the Great Salt Lake.

Bodies of brine may also form on the ocean floor at cold seeps. These are sometimes called brine lakes, but are more frequently referred to as brine pools. It is possible to observe waves on the surface of these bodies.

Man-made bodies of brine are created for edible salt production.  These can be referred to as brine ponds.

Threats and global decline 
Saline lakes are declining worldwide on every continent except Antarctica, mainly due to human causes, such as damming, diversions, and withdrawals. One of the largest factors causing this decline is agricultural irrigation. Among the most commonly cited examples is the Aral Sea, which has shrunk 90% in volume and 74% in area, which is mainly because of irrigation.

Another anthropogenic threat is climate change. Human-caused climate change is increasing temperature in many arid regions, drying soil, increasing evaporation, and reducing inflows to saline lakes.

Decline of saline lakes leads to many environmental problems, including human problems, such as toxic dust storms and air pollution, disrupted local water cycles, economic losses, loss of ecosystems, and more. It can even be more costly. For example, in the case of the decline of Owens Lake, dust stirred up from the dry lakebed has led to air quality higher than allowed by US-air quality standards. This has resulted in the city of Los Angeles spending $3.6 billion over the next 25 years to mitigate dust from the desiccated lakebed, which is more than the value of the diverted water.

Solutions to the decline of saline lakes can be multifaceted, and include water conservation and water budgeting, and mitigating climate change.

List 

Note: Some of the following are also partly fresh and/or brackish water.

Aral Sea
Aralsor
Aydar Lake
Bakhtegan Lake
Caspian Sea
Chilika Lake
Chott el Djerid
Dabusun Lake
Dead Sea
Devil's Lake
Don Juan Pond
Garabogazköl
Goose Lake
Great Salt Lake
Grevelingen
Laguna Colorada
Laguna Verde
Lake Abert
Lake Alakol
Lake Assal
Lake Balkhash
Lake Barlee
Lake Baskunchak
Lake Bumbunga
Lake Enriquillo
Lake Elton
Lake Eyre
Lake Gairdner
Lake Hillier
Lake Karum
Lake Mackay
Lake Natron
Lake Paliastomi
Lake Pontchartrain
Lake Texoma
Lake Torrens
Lake Tuz
Lake Tyrrell
Lake Urmia
Lake Van
Lake Vanda
Larnaca Salt Lake
Little Manitou Lake
Loch Hyne
Lonar Lake
Maharloo Lake
Mar Chiquita Lake
Mono Lake
Nam Lake
Pangong Lake
Pulicat Lake
Qarhan Playa
Redberry Lake
Salton Sea
Sambhar Salt Lake
Sarygamysh Lake
Sawa Lake
Siling Lake
South Hulsan Lake
Sutton Salt Lake
Uvs Lake

Gallery

See also

 
 
 Halophile – organism that thrives in high salt concentrations
 
 List of endorheic basins

References

External links
 

 
Endorheic lakes
Shrunken lakes
Salts